The 1989 Coupes de Spa was the seventh round of the 1989 World Sportscar Championship season. It took place at the Circuit de Spa-Francorchamps, Belgium on September 17, 1989.

Official results
Class winners in bold. Cars failing to complete 75% of winner's distance marked as Not Classified (NC).

Statistics
 Pole position - #61 Team Sauber Mercedes - 2:05.900
 Fastest lap - #61 Team Sauber Mercedes - 2:07.863
 Average speed - 183.005 km/h

References

 
 

Spa
1000km
6 Hours of Spa-Francorchamps